Mount William (also Mount Duwil) is a mountain of the Grampians Mountain Range, located within the Grampians National Park, in the Australian state of Victoria.

Features and location

Mount William is the highest point within the Grampians National Park. Sir Thomas Mitchell reached the summit with a group of explorers in 1836. The first settler in the area was Horatio Wills, who established a sheep run at Mount William in 1840, and named nearby Mount Ararat, after which the town is named. His son, cricketer and Australian rules football pioneer Tom Wills, grew up as a lone white child among the Djab wurrung Aboriginal tribes of Mount William.

Three transmission towers are located at the summit of Mount William including an amateur radio repeater. A sealed service road continues to the summit, but is not accessible by vehicle to the general public.

It will take a person of moderate fitness approximately 45 mins to walk. No permit is required to climb the mountain.

Gallery

Climate

Due to being an exposed peak in the far west of Victoria, Mount William features especially cool maximum temperatures throughout the year. Winter cloud cover is profound; with an extraordinary 26 days of precipitation in July, constituting an annual total of 215 days—quite possibly the highest figure of any site in mainland Australia.

Snowfalls are both frequent and heavy throughout the year. The peak can be classed as a cold Mediterranean climate on account of high summer (February) only averaging  of rainfall.

See also

 List of mountains in Victoria
 Pomonal, Victoria

References

External links
Geoscience Australia - Mount William

William
Grampians (national park)